S81 may refer to:

Aviation 
 Blériot-SPAD S.81, a French fighter aircraft
 Indian Creek USFS Airport, in Valley County, Idaho, United States
 Short S.81, an experimental British biplane seaplane

Other uses 
 S81 (New York City bus) serving Staten Island
 County Route S81 (Bergen County, New Jersey)
 Daihatsu Hijet (S81), a kei truck and microvan
 , a S-80 Plus class submarine
 Stola S81 Stratos, a concept car
 S81, a line of the St. Gallen S-Bahn
 S81, a postcode district for Worksop, England
 BenQ-Siemens S81, a BenQ mobile phone